Shirin Hassani Ramazan (born 1980) is an Iraqi Kurdish politician of the Kurdistan Democratic Party (KDP). She was born in Zakho.

References

1980 births
Living people
Iraqi Kurdistani politicians
Members of the Kurdistan Region Parliament
People from Zakho
Date of birth missing (living people)
Kurdistan Democratic Party politicians
21st-century Iraqi women politicians
21st-century Iraqi politicians